The 2016–17 Guadeloupe Division of Honor was the 66th season of the Guadeloupe Division of Honor, the top tier of association football in Guadeloupe. The season was contested by 14 teams, and began on 17 September 2016 and concluded on 19 May 2017.

Defending champions, USR, successfully defended their league title, finishing the season with 83 points and a 17-6-3 record. It was their second ever Guadeloupean league title. USR won the league title on 29 April 2017 with a 1-1 home draw against Phare.

Changes from 2015–16 

At the end of last season, L'Etoile, Solidarité SC and Club Amical finished in 12th, 13th and 14th place in the league and were relegated to the Promotion d'Honneur Régionale. Taking their places were the winners, runners up and third place team from the Promotion d'Honneur Régionale, CS Capesterrien, AS Gosier and U.S.C. de Bananier.

Table

External links

 Guadeloupe Division of Honor on RSSSF
 Guadeloupe Division of Honor on Soccerway

2016–17 in Caribbean football leagues
2016 in Guadeloupe
2017 in Guadeloupe
2016-17